Sheep or domestic sheep  (Ovis aries) are domesticated, ruminant mammals typically kept as livestock. Although the term sheep can apply to other species in the genus Ovis, in everyday usage it almost always refers to domesticated sheep. Like all ruminants, sheep are members of the order Artiodactyla, the even-toed ungulates. Numbering a little over one billion, domestic sheep are also the most numerous species of sheep. An adult female is referred to as a ewe, an intact male as a ram, occasionally a tup, a castrated male as a wether, and a young sheep as a lamb.

Sheep are most likely descended from the wild mouflon of Europe and Asia, with Iran being a geographic envelope of the domestication center. One of the earliest animals to be domesticated for agricultural purposes, sheep are raised for fleeces, meat (lamb, hogget or mutton) and milk. A sheep's wool is the most widely used animal fiber, and is usually harvested by shearing. In Commonwealth countries, ovine meat is called lamb when from younger animals and mutton when from older ones; in the United States, meat from both older and younger animals is usually called lamb. Sheep continue to be important for wool and meat today, and are also occasionally raised for pelts, as dairy animals, or as model organisms for science.

Sheep husbandry is practised throughout the majority of the inhabited world, and has been fundamental to many civilizations. In the modern era, Australia, New Zealand, the southern and central South American nations, and the British Isles are most closely associated with sheep production.

There is a large lexicon of unique terms for sheep husbandry which vary considerably by region and dialect. Use of the word sheep began in Middle English as a derivation of the Old English word ; it is both the singular and plural name for the animal. A group of sheep is called a flock. Many other specific terms for the various life stages of sheep exist, generally related to lambing, shearing, and age.

Being a key animal in the history of farming, sheep have a deeply entrenched place in human culture, and are represented in much modern language and symbolism. As livestock, sheep are most often associated with pastoral, Arcadian imagery. Sheep figure in many mythologies—such as the Golden Fleece—and major religions, especially the Abrahamic traditions. In both ancient and modern religious ritual, sheep are used as sacrificial animals.

History

The exact line of descent from wild ancestors to domestic sheep is unclear. The most common hypothesis states that Ovis aries is descended from the Asiatic (O. gmelini) species of mouflon; the European mouflon (Ovis aries musimon) is a direct descendant of this population. Sheep were among the first animals to be domesticated by humankind (although the domestication of dogs probably took place 10 to 20 thousand years earlier); the domestication date is estimated to fall between 11,000 and 9,000 B.C in Mesopotamia and possibly around 7,000 B.C. in Mehrgarh in the Indus Valley. The rearing of sheep for secondary products, and the resulting breed development, began in either southwest Asia or western Europe. Initially, sheep were kept solely for meat, milk and skins. Archaeological evidence from statuary found at sites in Iran suggests that selection for woolly sheep may have begun around 6000 BC, and the earliest woven wool garments have been dated to two to three thousand years later.

Sheep husbandry spread quickly in  Europe. Excavations show that in about 6000 BC, during the Neolithic period of prehistory, the Castelnovien people, living around Châteauneuf-les-Martigues near present-day Marseille in the south of France, were among the first in Europe to keep domestic sheep. Practically from its inception, ancient Greek civilization relied on sheep as primary livestock, and were even said to name individual animals. Ancient Romans kept sheep on a wide scale, and were an important agent in the spread of sheep raising. Pliny the Elder, in his Natural History (Naturalis Historia), speaks at length about sheep and wool. European colonists spread the practice to the New World from 1493 onwards.

Characteristics
Domestic sheep are relatively small ruminants, usually with a crimped hair called wool and often with horns forming a lateral spiral. They differ from their wild relatives and ancestors in several respects, having become uniquely neotenic as a result of selective breeding by humans. A few primitive breeds of sheep retain some of the characteristics of their wild cousins, such as short tails. Depending on breed, domestic sheep may have no horns at all (i.e. polled), or horns in both sexes, or in males only. Most horned breeds have a single pair, but a few breeds may have several.

Another trait unique to domestic sheep as compared to wild ovines is their wide variation in color. Wild sheep are largely variations of brown hues, and variation within species is extremely limited. Colors of domestic sheep range from pure white to dark chocolate brown, and even spotted or piebald. Sheep keepers also sometimes artificially paint "smit marks" onto their sheep in any pattern or color for identification. Selection for easily dyeable white fleeces began early in sheep domestication, and as white wool is a dominant trait it spread quickly. However, colored sheep do appear in many modern breeds, and may even appear as a recessive trait in white flocks. While white wool is desirable for large commercial markets, there is a niche market for colored fleeces, mostly for handspinning. The nature of the fleece varies widely among the breeds, from dense and highly crimped, to long and hairlike. There is variation of wool type and quality even among members of the same flock, so wool classing is a step in the commercial processing of the fibre.

Depending on breed, sheep show a range of heights and weights. Their rate of growth and mature weight is a heritable trait that is often selected for in breeding. When all deciduous teeth have erupted, the sheep has 20 teeth. Mature sheep have 32 teeth. As with other ruminants, the front teeth in the lower jaw bite against a hard, toothless pad in the upper jaw. These are used to pick off vegetation, then the rear teeth grind it before it is swallowed. There are eight lower front teeth in ruminants, but there is some disagreement as to whether these are eight incisors, or six incisors and two incisor-shaped canines. This means that the dental formula for sheep is either  or   There is a large diastema between the incisors and the molars.

In the first few years of life one can calculate the age of sheep from their front teeth, as a pair of milk teeth is replaced by larger adult teeth each year, the full set of eight adult front teeth being complete at about four years of age. The front teeth are then gradually lost as sheep age, making it harder for them to feed and hindering the health and productivity of the animal. For this reason, domestic sheep on normal pasture begin to slowly decline from four years on, and the life expectancy of a sheep is 10 to 12 years, though some sheep may live as long as 20 years. Sheep have good hearing, and are sensitive to noise when being handled. Sheep have horizontal slit-shaped pupils, with excellent peripheral vision; with visual fields of about 270° to 320°, sheep can see behind themselves without turning their heads. Many breeds have only short hair on the face, and some have facial wool (if any) confined to the poll and or the area of the mandibular angle; the wide angles of peripheral vision apply to these breeds. A few breeds tend to have considerable wool on the face; for some individuals of these breeds, peripheral vision may be greatly reduced by "wool blindness", unless recently shorn about the face. Sheep have poor depth perception; shadows and dips in the ground may cause sheep to baulk. In general, sheep have a tendency to move out of the dark and into well-lit areas, and prefer to move uphill when disturbed. Sheep also have an excellent sense of smell, and, like all species of their genus, have scent glands just in front of the eyes, and interdigitally on the feet. The purpose of these glands is uncertain, but those on the face may be used in breeding behaviors. The foot glands might also be related to reproduction, but alternative functions, such as secretion of a waste product or a scent marker to help lost sheep find their flock, have also been proposed.

Comparison with goats 
Sheep and goats are closely related: both are in the subfamily Caprinae. However, they are separate species, so hybrids rarely occur and are always infertile. A hybrid of a ewe and a buck (a male goat) is called a sheep-goat hybrid, known as geep. Visual differences between sheep and goats include the beard of goats and divided upper lip of sheep. Sheep tails also hang down, even when short or docked, while the short tails of goats are held upwards. Also, sheep breeds are often naturally polled (either in both sexes or just in the female), while naturally polled goats are rare (though many are polled artificially). Males of the two species differ in that buck goats acquire a unique and strong odor during the rut, whereas rams do not.

Breeds

The domestic sheep is a multi-purpose animal, and the more than 200 breeds now in existence were created to serve these diverse purposes. Some sources give a count of a thousand or more breeds, but these numbers cannot be verified, according to some sources. However, several hundred breeds of sheep have been identified by the Food and Agriculture Organization of the UN (FAO), with the estimated number varying somewhat from time to time: e.g. 863 breeds as of 1993, 1314 breeds as of 1995 and 1229 breeds as of 2006. (These numbers exclude extinct breeds, which are also tallied by the FAO.) For the purpose of such tallies, the FAO definition of a breed is "either a subspecific group of domestic livestock with definable and identifiable external characteristics that enable it to be separated by visual appraisal from other similarly defined groups within the same species or a group for which geographical and/or cultural separation from phenotypically similar groups has led to acceptance of its separate identity." Almost all sheep are classified as being best suited to furnishing a certain product: wool, meat, milk, hides, or a combination in a dual-purpose breed. Other features used when classifying sheep include face color (generally white or black), tail length, presence or lack of horns, and the topography for which the breed has been developed. This last point is especially stressed in the UK, where breeds are described as either upland (hill or mountain) or lowland breeds. A sheep may also be of a fat-tailed type, which is a dual-purpose sheep common in Africa and Asia with larger deposits of fat within and around its tail.

Breeds are often categorized by the type of their wool. Fine wool breeds are those that have wool of great crimp and density, which are preferred for textiles. Most of these were derived from Merino sheep, and the breed continues to dominate the world sheep industry. Downs breeds have wool between the extremes, and are typically fast-growing meat and ram breeds with dark faces. Some major medium wool breeds, such as the Corriedale, are dual-purpose crosses of long and fine-wooled breeds and were created for high-production commercial flocks. Long wool breeds are the largest of sheep, with long wool and a slow rate of growth. Long wool sheep are most valued for crossbreeding to improve the attributes of other sheep types. For example: the American Columbia breed was developed by crossing Lincoln rams (a long wool breed) with fine-wooled Rambouillet ewes.

Coarse or carpet wool sheep are those with a medium to long length wool of characteristic coarseness. Breeds traditionally used for carpet wool show great variability, but the chief requirement is a wool that will not break down under heavy use (as would that of the finer breeds). As the demand for carpet-quality wool declines, some breeders of this type of sheep are attempting to use a few of these traditional breeds for alternative purposes. Others have always been primarily meat-class sheep.

A minor class of sheep are the dairy breeds. Dual-purpose breeds that may primarily be meat or wool sheep are often used secondarily as milking animals, but there are a few breeds that are predominantly used for milking. These sheep produce a higher quantity of milk and have slightly longer lactation curves. In the quality of their milk, the fat and protein content percentages of dairy sheep vary from non-dairy breeds, but lactose content does not.

A last group of sheep breeds is that of fur or hair sheep, which do not grow wool at all. Hair sheep are similar to the early domesticated sheep kept before woolly breeds were developed, and are raised for meat and pelts. Some modern breeds of hair sheep, such as the Dorper, result from crosses between wool and hair breeds. For meat and hide producers, hair sheep are cheaper to keep, as they do not need shearing. Hair sheep are also more resistant to parasites and hot weather.

With the modern rise of corporate agribusiness and the decline of localized family farms, many breeds of sheep are in danger of extinction. The Rare Breeds Survival Trust of the UK lists 22 native breeds as having only 3,000 registered animals (each), and The Livestock Conservancy lists 14 as either "critical" or "threatened". Preferences for breeds with uniform characteristics and fast growth have pushed heritage (or heirloom) breeds to the margins of the sheep industry. Those that remain are maintained through the efforts of conservation organizations, breed registries, and individual farmers dedicated to their preservation.

Diet
Sheep are herbivorous mammals. Most breeds prefer to graze on grass and other short roughage, avoiding the taller woody parts of plants that goats readily consume. Both sheep and goats use their lips and tongues to select parts of the plant that are easier to digest or higher in nutrition. Sheep, however, graze well in monoculture pastures where most goats fare poorly.

Like all ruminants, sheep have a complex digestive system composed of four chambers, allowing them to break down cellulose from stems, leaves, and seed hulls into simpler carbohydrates. When sheep graze, vegetation is chewed into a mass called a bolus, which is then passed into the rumen, via the reticulum. The rumen is a 19- to 38-liter (5 to 10 gallon) organ in which feed is fermented. The fermenting organisms include bacteria, fungi, and protozoa. (Other important rumen organisms include some archaea, which produce methane from carbon dioxide.) The bolus is periodically regurgitated back to the mouth as cud for additional chewing and salivation. After fermentation in the rumen, feed passes into the reticulum and the omasum; special feeds such as grains may bypass the rumen altogether. After the first three chambers, food moves into the abomasum for final digestion before processing by the intestines. The abomasum is the only one of the four chambers analogous to the human stomach, and is sometimes called the "true stomach".

Other than forage, the other staple feed for sheep is hay, often during the winter months. The ability to thrive solely on pasture (even without hay) varies with breed, but all sheep can survive on this diet. Also included in some sheep's diets are minerals, either in a trace mix or in licks. Feed provided to sheep must be specially formulated, as most cattle, poultry, pig, and even some goat feeds contain levels of copper that are lethal to sheep. The same danger applies to mineral supplements such as salt licks.

Grazing behavior
Sheep follow a diurnal pattern of activity, feeding from dawn to dusk, stopping sporadically to rest and chew their cud. Ideal pasture for sheep is not lawnlike grass, but an array of grasses, legumes and forbs. Types of land where sheep are raised vary widely, from pastures that are seeded and improved intentionally to rough, native lands. Common plants toxic to sheep are present in most of the world, and include (but are not limited to) cherry, some oaks and acorns, tomato, yew, rhubarb, potato, and rhododendron.

Effects on pasture

Sheep are largely grazing herbivores, unlike browsing animals such as goats and deer that prefer taller foliage. With a much narrower face, sheep crop plants very close to the ground and can overgraze a pasture much faster than cattle. For this reason, many shepherds use managed intensive rotational grazing, where a flock is rotated through multiple pastures, giving plants time to recover. Paradoxically, sheep can both cause and solve the spread of invasive plant species. By disturbing the natural state of pasture, sheep and other livestock can pave the way for invasive plants. However, sheep also prefer to eat invasives such as cheatgrass, leafy spurge, kudzu and spotted knapweed over native species such as sagebrush, making grazing sheep effective for conservation grazing. Research conducted in Imperial County, California compared lamb grazing with herbicides for weed control in seedling alfalfa fields. Three trials demonstrated that grazing lambs were just as effective as herbicides in controlling winter weeds. Entomologists also compared grazing lambs to insecticides for insect control in winter alfalfa. In this trial, lambs provided insect control as effectively as insecticides.

Behavior

Flock behavior
Sheep are flock animals and strongly gregarious; much sheep behavior can be understood on the basis of these tendencies. The dominance hierarchy of sheep and their natural inclination to follow a leader to new pastures were the pivotal factors in sheep being one of the first domesticated livestock species. Furthermore, in contrast to the red deer and gazelle (two other ungulates of primary importance to meat production in prehistoric times), sheep do not defend territories although they do form home ranges. All sheep have a tendency to congregate close to other members of a flock, although this behavior varies with breed, and sheep can become stressed when separated from their flock members. During flocking, sheep have a strong tendency to follow, and a leader may simply be the first individual to move.  Relationships in flocks tend to be closest among related sheep: in mixed-breed flocks, subgroups of the same breed tend to form, and a ewe and her direct descendants often move as a unit within large flocks. Sheep can become hefted to one particular local pasture (heft) so they do not roam freely in unfenced landscapes. Lambs learn the heft from ewes and if whole flocks are culled it must be retaught to the replacement animals.

Flock behaviour in sheep is generally only exhibited in groups of four or more sheep; fewer sheep may not react as expected when alone or with few other sheep. Being a prey species, the primary defense mechanism of sheep is to flee from danger when their flight zone is entered. Cornered sheep may charge and butt, or threaten by hoof stamping and adopting an aggressive posture. This is particularly true for ewes with newborn lambs.

In regions where sheep have no natural predators, none of the native breeds of sheep exhibit a strong flocking behavior.

Herding

Farmers exploit flocking behavior to keep sheep together on unfenced pastures such as hill farming, and to move them more easily. For this purpose shepherds may use herding dogs in this effort, with a highly bred herding ability. Sheep are food-oriented, and association of humans with regular feeding often results in sheep soliciting people for food. Those who are moving sheep may exploit this behavior by leading sheep with buckets of feed.

Dominance hierarchy
Sheep establish a dominance hierarchy through fighting, threats and competitiveness. Dominant animals are inclined to be more aggressive with other sheep, and usually feed first at troughs. Primarily among rams, horn size is a factor in the flock hierarchy. Rams with different size horns may be less inclined to fight to establish the dominance order, while rams with similarly sized horns are more so. Merinos have an almost linear hierarchy whereas there is a less rigid structure in Border Leicesters when a competitive feeding situation arises.

In sheep, position in a moving flock is highly correlated with social dominance, but there is no definitive study to show consistent voluntary leadership by an individual sheep.

Intelligence and learning ability
Sheep are frequently thought of as unintelligent animals. Their flocking behavior and quickness to flee and panic can make shepherding a difficult endeavor for the uninitiated. Despite these perceptions, a University of Illinois monograph on sheep reported their intelligence to be just below that of pigs and on par with that of cattle.
Sheep can recognize individual human and ovine faces and remember them for years; they can remember 50 other different sheep faces for over two years; they can recognize and are attracted to individual sheep and humans by their faces, as they possess similar specialized neural systems in the temporal and frontal lobes of their brains to humans and have a greater involvement of the right brain hemisphere. In addition to long-term facial recognition of individuals, sheep can also differentiate emotional states through facial characteristics. If worked with patiently, sheep may learn their names, and many sheep are trained to be led by halter for showing and other purposes. Sheep have also responded well to clicker training. Sheep have been used as pack animals; Tibetan nomads distribute baggage equally throughout a flock as it is herded between living sites.

It has been reported that some sheep have apparently shown problem-solving abilities; a flock in West Yorkshire, England allegedly found a way to get over cattle grids by rolling on their backs, although documentation of this has relied on anecdotal accounts.

Vocalisations

Sounds made by domestic sheep include bleats, grunts, rumbles and snorts. Bleating ("baaing") is used mostly for contact communication, especially between dam and lambs, but also at times between other flock members. The bleats of individual sheep are distinctive, enabling the ewe and her lambs to recognize each other's vocalizations. Vocal communication between lambs and their dam declines to a very low level within several weeks after parturition. A variety of bleats may be heard, depending on sheep age and circumstances. Apart from contact communication, bleating may signal distress, frustration or impatience; however, sheep are usually silent when in pain. Isolation commonly prompts bleating by sheep. Pregnant ewes may grunt when in labor. Rumbling sounds are made by the ram during courting; somewhat similar rumbling sounds may be made by the ewe, especially when with her neonate lambs. A snort (explosive exhalation through the nostrils) may signal aggression or a warning, and is often elicited from startled sheep.

Senses

In sheep breeds lacking facial wool, the visual field is wide. In 10 sheep (Cambridge, Lleyn and Welsh Mountain breeds, which lack facial wool), the visual field ranged from 298° to 325°, averaging 313.1°, with binocular overlap ranging from 44.5° to 74°, averaging 61.7°. In some breeds, unshorn facial wool can limit the visual field; in some individuals, this may be enough to cause "wool blindness". In 60 Merinos, visual fields ranged from 219.1° to 303.0°, averaging 269.9°, and the binocular field ranged from 8.9° to 77.7°, averaging 47.5°; 36% of the measurements were limited by wool, although photographs of the experiments indicate that only limited facial wool regrowth had occurred since shearing. In addition to facial wool (in some breeds), visual field limitations can include ears and (in some breeds) horns, so the visual field can be extended by tilting the head. Sheep eyes exhibit very low hyperopia and little astigmatism. Such visual characteristics are likely to produce a well-focused retinal image of objects in both the middle and long distance. Because sheep eyes have no accommodation, one might expect the image of very near objects to be blurred, but a rather clear near image could be provided by the tapetum and large retinal image of the sheep's eye, and adequate close vision may occur at muzzle length. Good depth perception, inferred from the sheep's sure-footedness, was confirmed in "visual cliff" experiments; behavioral responses indicating depth perception are seen in lambs at one day old. Sheep are thought to have colour vision, and can distinguish between a variety of colours: black, red, brown, green, yellow and white. Sight is a vital part of sheep communication, and when grazing, they maintain visual contact with each other. Each sheep lifts its head upwards to check the position of other sheep in the flock. This constant monitoring is probably what keeps the sheep in a flock as they move along grazing. Sheep become stressed when isolated; this stress is reduced if they are provided with a mirror, indicating that the sight of other sheep reduces stress.

Taste is the most important sense in sheep, establishing forage preferences, with sweet and sour plants being preferred and bitter plants being more commonly rejected. Touch and sight are also important in relation to specific plant characteristics, such as succulence and growth form.

The ram uses his vomeronasal organ (sometimes called the Jacobson's organ) to sense the pheromones of ewes and detect when they are in estrus. The ewe uses her vomeronasal organ for early recognition of her neonate lamb.

Reproduction

Sheep follow a similar reproductive strategy to other herd animals. A group of ewes is generally mated by a single ram, who has either been chosen by a breeder or (in feral populations) has established dominance through physical contest with other rams. Most sheep are seasonal breeders, although some are able to breed year-round. Ewes generally reach sexual maturity at six to eight months old, and rams generally at four to six months. However, there are exceptions. For example, Finnsheep ewe lambs may reach puberty as early as 3 to 4 months, and Merino ewes sometimes reach puberty at 18 to 20 months. Ewes have estrus cycles about every 17 days, during which they emit a scent and indicate readiness through physical displays towards rams. A minority of rams (8% on average) display a preference for homosexuality and a small number of the females that were accompanied by a male fetus in utero are freemartins (female animals that are behaviorally masculine and lack functioning ovaries).

In feral sheep, rams may fight during the rut to determine which individuals may mate with ewes. Rams, especially unfamiliar ones, will also fight outside the breeding period to establish dominance; rams can kill one another if allowed to mix freely. During the rut, even usually friendly rams may become aggressive towards humans due to increases in their hormone levels.

After mating, sheep have a gestation period of about five months, and normal labor takes one to three hours. Although some breeds regularly throw larger litters of lambs, most produce single or twin lambs. During or soon after labor, ewes and lambs may be confined to small lambing jugs, small pens designed to aid both careful observation of ewes and to cement the bond between them and their lambs.

Ovine obstetrics can be problematic. By selectively breeding ewes that produce multiple offspring with higher birth weights for generations, sheep producers have inadvertently caused some domestic sheep to have difficulty lambing; balancing ease of lambing with high productivity is one of the dilemmas of sheep breeding. In the case of any such problems, those present at lambing may assist the ewe by extracting or repositioning lambs. After the birth, ewes ideally break the amniotic sac (if it is not broken during labor), and begin licking clean the lamb. Most lambs will begin standing within an hour of birth. In normal situations, lambs nurse after standing, receiving vital colostrum milk. Lambs that either fail to nurse or are rejected by the ewe require help to survive, such as bottle-feeding or fostering by another ewe.

Most lambs begin life being born outdoors. After lambs are several weeks old, lamb marking (ear tagging, docking, mulesing, and castrating) is carried out. Vaccinations are usually carried out at this point as well. Ear tags with numbers are attached, or ear marks are applied, for ease of later identification of sheep. Docking and castration are commonly done after 24 hours (to avoid interference with maternal bonding and consumption of colostrum) and are often done not later than one week after birth, to minimize pain, stress, recovery time and complications. The first course of vaccinations (commonly anti-clostridial) is commonly given at an age of about 10 to 12 weeks; i.e. when the concentration of maternal antibodies passively acquired via colostrum is expected to have fallen low enough to permit development of active immunity. Ewes are often revaccinated annually about 3 weeks before lambing, to provide high antibody concentrations in colostrum during the first several hours after lambing. Ram lambs that will either be slaughtered or separated from ewes before sexual maturity are not usually castrated. Objections to all these procedures have been raised by animal rights groups, but farmers defend them by saying they save money, and inflict only temporary pain.

Health

Sheep may fall victim to poisons, infectious diseases, and physical injuries. As a prey species, a sheep's system is adapted to hide the obvious signs of illness, to prevent being targeted by predators. However, some signs of ill health are obvious, with sick sheep eating little, vocalizing excessively, and being generally listless. Throughout history, much of the money and labor of sheep husbandry has aimed to prevent sheep ailments. Historically, shepherds often created remedies by experimentation on the farm. In some developed countries, including the United States, sheep lack the economic importance for drug companies to perform expensive clinical trials required to approve more than a relatively limited number of drugs for ovine use. However, extra-label drug use in sheep production is permitted in many jurisdictions, subject to certain restrictions. In the US, for example, regulations governing extra-label drug use in animals are found in 21 CFR (Code of Federal Regulations) Part 530. In the 20th and 21st centuries, a minority of sheep owners have turned to alternative treatments such as homeopathy, herbalism and even traditional Chinese medicine to treat sheep veterinary problems. Despite some favorable anecdotal evidence, the effectiveness of alternative veterinary medicine has been met with skepticism in scientific journals. The need for traditional anti-parasite drugs and antibiotics is widespread, and is the main impediment to certified organic farming with sheep.

Many breeders take a variety of preventive measures to ward off problems. The first is to ensure all sheep are healthy when purchased. Many buyers avoid outlets known to be clearing houses for animals culled from healthy flocks as either sick or simply inferior. This can also mean maintaining a closed flock, and quarantining new sheep for a month. Two fundamental preventive programs are maintaining good nutrition and reducing stress in the sheep. Restraint, isolation, loud noises, novel situations, pain, heat, extreme cold, fatigue and other stressors can lead to secretion of cortisol, a stress hormone, in amounts that may indicate welfare problems. Excessive stress can compromise the immune system. "Shipping fever" (pneumonic mannheimiosis, formerly called pasteurellosis) is a disease of particular concern, that can occur as a result of stress, notably during transport and (or) handling. Pain, fear and several other stressors can cause secretion of epinephrine (adrenaline). Considerable epinephrine secretion in the final days before slaughter can adversely affect meat quality (by causing glycogenolysis, removing the substrate for normal post-slaughter acidification of meat) and result in meat becoming more susceptible to colonization by spoilage bacteria. Because of such issues, low-stress handling is essential in sheep management. Avoiding poisoning is also important; common poisons are pesticide sprays, inorganic fertilizer, motor oil, as well as radiator coolant containing ethylene glycol.

Common forms of preventive medication for sheep are vaccinations and treatments for parasites. Both external and internal parasites are the most prevalent malady in sheep, and are either fatal, or reduce the productivity of flocks. Worms are the most common internal parasites. They are ingested during grazing, incubate within the sheep, and are expelled through the digestive system (beginning the cycle again). Oral anti-parasitic medicines, known as drenches, are given to a flock to treat worms, sometimes after worm eggs in the feces has been counted to assess infestation levels. Afterwards, sheep may be moved to a new pasture to avoid ingesting the same parasites. External sheep parasites include: lice (for different parts of the body), sheep keds, nose bots, sheep itch mites, and maggots. Keds are blood-sucking parasites that cause general malnutrition and decreased productivity, but are not fatal. Maggots are those of the bot fly and the blow-fly, commonly Lucilia sericata or its relative L. cuprina. Fly maggots cause the extremely destructive condition of flystrike. Flies lay their eggs in wounds or wet, manure-soiled wool; when the maggots hatch they burrow into a sheep's flesh, eventually causing death if untreated. In addition to other treatments, crutching (shearing wool from a sheep's rump) is a common preventive method. Some countries allow mulesing, a practice that involves stripping away the skin on the rump to prevent fly-strike, normally performed when the sheep is a lamb.  Nose bots are fly larvae that inhabit a sheep's sinuses, causing breathing difficulties and discomfort. Common signs are a discharge from the nasal passage, sneezing, and frantic movement such as head shaking. External parasites may be controlled through the use of backliners, sprays or immersive sheep dips.

A wide array of bacterial and viral diseases affect sheep. Diseases of the hoof, such as foot rot and foot scald may occur, and are treated with footbaths and other remedies. Foot rot is present in over 97% of flocks in the UK. These painful conditions cause lameness and hinder feeding. Ovine Johne's disease is a wasting disease that affects young sheep. Bluetongue disease is an insect-borne illness causing fever and inflammation of the mucous membranes. Ovine rinderpest (or peste des petits ruminants) is a highly contagious and often fatal viral disease affecting sheep and goats. Sheep may also be affected by primary or secondary photosensitization. Tetanus can also afflict sheep through wounds from shearing, docking, castration, or vaccination. The organism also can be introduced into the reproductive tract by unsanitary humans who assist ewes during lambing.

A few sheep conditions are transmissible to humans. Orf (also known as scabby mouth, contagious ecthyma or soremouth) is a skin disease leaving lesions that is transmitted through skin-to-skin contact. Cutaneous anthrax is also called woolsorter's disease, as the spores can be transmitted in unwashed wool. More seriously, the organisms that can cause spontaneous enzootic abortion in sheep are easily transmitted to pregnant women. Also of concern are the prion disease scrapie and the virus that causes foot-and-mouth disease (FMD), as both can devastate flocks. The latter poses a slight risk to humans. During the 2001 FMD pandemic in the UK, hundreds of sheep were culled and some rare British breeds were at risk of extinction due to this.

Of the 600,300 sheep lost to the US economy in 2004, 37.3% were lost to predators, while 26.5% were lost to some form of disease. Poisoning accounted for 1.7% of non-productive deaths.

Predators

Other than parasites and disease, predation is a threat to sheep and the profitability of sheep raising. Sheep have little ability to defend themselves, compared with other species kept as livestock. Even if sheep survive an attack, they may die from their injuries or simply from panic. However, the impact of predation varies dramatically with region. In Africa, Australia, the Americas, and parts of Europe and Asia predators are a serious problem. In the United States, for instance, over one third of sheep deaths in 2004 were caused by predation. In contrast, other nations are virtually devoid of sheep predators, particularly islands known for extensive sheep husbandry. Worldwide, canids—including the domestic dog—are responsible for most sheep deaths. Other animals that occasionally prey on sheep include: felines, bears, birds of prey, ravens and feral hogs.

Sheep producers have used a wide variety of measures to combat predation. Pre-modern shepherds used their own presence, livestock guardian dogs, and protective structures such as barns and fencing. Fencing (both regular and electric), penning sheep at night and lambing indoors all continue to be widely used. More modern shepherds used guns, traps, and poisons to kill predators, causing significant decreases in predator populations. In the wake of the environmental and conservation movements, the use of these methods now usually falls under the purview of specially designated government agencies in most developed countries.

The 1970s saw a resurgence in the use of livestock guardian dogs and the development of new methods of predator control by sheep producers, many of them non-lethal. Donkeys and guard llamas have been used since the 1980s in sheep operations, using the same basic principle as livestock guardian dogs. Interspecific pasturing, usually with larger livestock such as cattle or horses, may help to deter predators, even if such species do not actively guard sheep. In addition to animal guardians, contemporary sheep operations may use non-lethal predator deterrents such as motion-activated lights and noisy alarms.

Economic importance

Sheep are an important part of the global agricultural economy. However, their once vital status has been largely replaced by other livestock species, especially the pig, chicken, and cow. China, Australia, India, and Iran have the largest modern flocks, and serve both local and exportation needs for wool and mutton. Other countries such as New Zealand have smaller flocks but retain a large international economic impact due to their export of sheep products. Sheep also play a major role in many local economies, which may be niche markets focused on organic or sustainable agriculture and local food customers. Especially in developing countries, such flocks may be a part of subsistence agriculture rather than a system of trade. Sheep themselves may be a medium of trade in barter economies.

Domestic sheep provide a wide array of raw materials. Wool was one of the first textiles, although in the late 20th century wool prices began to fall dramatically as the result of the popularity and cheap prices for synthetic fabrics. For many sheep owners, the cost of shearing is greater than the possible profit from the fleece, making subsisting on wool production alone practically impossible without farm subsidies. Fleeces are used as material in making alternative products such as wool insulation. In the 21st century, the sale of meat is the most profitable enterprise in the sheep industry, even though far less sheep meat is consumed than chicken, pork or beef.

Sheepskin is likewise used for making clothes, footwear, rugs, and other products. Byproducts from the slaughter of sheep are also of value: sheep tallow can be used in candle and soap making, sheep bone and cartilage has been used to furnish carved items such as dice and buttons as well as rendered glue and gelatin. Sheep intestine can be formed into sausage casings, and lamb intestine has been formed into surgical sutures, as well as strings for musical instruments and tennis rackets. Sheep droppings, which are high in cellulose, have even been sterilized and mixed with traditional pulp materials to make paper. Of all sheep byproducts, perhaps the most valuable is lanolin: the waterproof, fatty substance found naturally in sheep's wool and used as a base for innumerable cosmetics and other products.

Some farmers who keep sheep also make a profit from live sheep. Providing lambs for youth programs such as 4-H and competition at agricultural shows is often a dependable avenue for the sale of sheep. Farmers may also choose to focus on a particular breed of sheep in order to sell registered purebred animals, as well as provide a ram rental service for breeding. A new option for deriving profit from live sheep is the rental of flocks for grazing; these "mowing services" are hired in order to keep unwanted vegetation down in public spaces and to lessen fire hazard.

Despite the falling demand and price for sheep products in many markets, sheep have distinct economic advantages when compared with other livestock. They do not require expensive housing, such as that used in the intensive farming of chickens or pigs. They are an efficient use of land; roughly six sheep can be kept on the amount that would suffice for a single cow or horse. Sheep can also consume plants, such as noxious weeds, that most other animals will not touch, and produce more young at a faster rate. Also, in contrast to most livestock species, the cost of raising sheep is not necessarily tied to the price of feed crops such as grain, soybeans and corn. Combined with the  lower cost of quality sheep, all these factors combine to equal a lower overhead for sheep producers, thus entailing a higher profitability potential for the small farmer. Sheep are especially beneficial for independent producers, including family farms with limited resources, as the sheep industry is one of the few types of animal agriculture that has not been vertically integrated by agribusiness. However, small flocks, from 10 to 50 ewes, often are not profitable because they tend to be poorly managed. The primary reason is that mechanization is not feasible, so return per hour of labor is not maximized. Small farm flocks generally are used simply to control weeds on irrigation ditches or maintained as a hobby.

As food

Sheep meat and milk were one of the earliest staple proteins consumed by human civilization after the transition from hunting and gathering to agriculture. Sheep meat prepared for food is known as either mutton or lamb, and approximately 540 million sheep are slaughtered each year for meat worldwide. "Mutton" is derived from the Old French moton, which was the word for sheep used by the Anglo-Norman rulers of much of the British Isles in the Middle Ages. This became the name for sheep meat in English, while the Old English word sceap was kept for the live animal. Throughout modern history, "mutton" has been limited to the meat of mature sheep usually at least two years of age; "lamb" is used for that of immature sheep less than a year.

In the 21st century, the nations with the highest consumption of sheep meat are the Arab States of the Persian Gulf, New Zealand, Australia, Greece, Uruguay, the United Kingdom and Ireland. These countries eat 14–40 lbs (3–18 kg) of sheep meat per capita, per annum. Sheep meat is also popular in France, Africa (especially the Arab World), the Caribbean, the rest of the Middle East, India, and parts of China. This often reflects a history of sheep production. In these countries in particular, dishes comprising alternative cuts and offal may be popular or traditional. Sheep testicles—called animelles or lamb fries—are considered a delicacy in many parts of the world. Perhaps the most unusual dish of sheep meat is the Scottish haggis, composed of various sheep innards cooked along with oatmeal and chopped onions inside its stomach. In comparison, countries such as the U.S. consume only a pound or less (under 0.5 kg), with Americans eating 50 pounds (22 kg) of pork and 65 pounds (29 kg) of beef. In addition, such countries rarely eat mutton, and may favor the more expensive cuts of lamb: mostly lamb chops and leg of lamb.

Though sheep's milk may be drunk rarely in fresh form, today it is used predominantly in cheese and yogurt making. Sheep have only two teats, and produce a far smaller volume of milk than cows. However, as sheep's milk contains far more fat, solids, and minerals than cow's milk, it is ideal for the cheese-making process. It also resists contamination during cooling better because of its much higher calcium content. Well-known cheeses made from sheep milk include the Feta of Bulgaria and Greece, Roquefort of France, Manchego from Spain, the Pecorino Romano (the Italian word for sheep is pecore) and Ricotta of Italy. Yogurts, especially some forms of strained yogurt, may also be made from sheep milk. Many of these products are now often made with cow's milk, especially when produced outside their country of origin. Sheep milk contains 4.8% lactose, which may affect those who are intolerant.

As with other domestic animals, the meat of uncastrated males is inferior in quality, especially as they grow. A "bucky" lamb is a lamb which was not castrated early enough, or which was castrated improperly (resulting in one testicle being retained). These lambs are worth less at market.

In science

Sheep are generally too large and reproduce too slowly to make ideal research subjects, and thus are not a common model organism. They have, however, played an influential role in some fields of science. In particular, the Roslin Institute of Edinburgh, Scotland used sheep for genetics research that produced groundbreaking results. In 1995, two ewes named Megan and Morag were the first mammals cloned from differentiated cells, also referred to as gynomerogony. A year later, a Finnish Dorset sheep named Dolly, dubbed "the world's most famous sheep" in Scientific American, was the first mammal to be cloned from an adult somatic cell. Following this, Polly and Molly were the first mammals to be simultaneously cloned and transgenic. 

As of 2008, the sheep genome has not been fully sequenced, although a detailed genetic map has been published, and a draft version of the complete genome produced by assembling sheep DNA sequences using information given by the genomes of other mammals. In 2012, a transgenic sheep named "Peng Peng" was cloned by Chinese scientists, who spliced his genes with that of a roundworm (C. elegans) in order to increase production of fats healthier for human consumption.

In the study of natural selection, the population of Soay sheep that remain on the island of Hirta have been used to explore the relation of body size and coloration to reproductive success. Soay sheep come in several colors, and researchers investigated why the larger, darker sheep were in decline; this occurrence contradicted the rule of thumb that larger members of a population tend to be more successful reproductively. The feral Soays on Hirta are especially useful subjects because they are isolated.

Sheep are one of the few animals where the molecular basis of the diversity of male sexual preferences has been examined. However, this research has been controversial, and much publicity has been produced by a study at the Oregon Health and Science University that investigated the mechanisms that produce homosexuality in rams. Organizations such as PETA campaigned against the study, accusing scientists of trying to cure homosexuality in the sheep. OHSU and the involved scientists vehemently denied such accusations.

Domestic sheep are sometimes used in medical research, particularly for researching cardiovascular physiology, in areas such as hypertension and heart failure. Pregnant sheep are also a useful model for human pregnancy, and have been used to investigate the effects on fetal development of malnutrition and hypoxia. In behavioral sciences, sheep have been used in isolated cases for the study of facial recognition, as their mental process of recognition is qualitatively similar to humans.

Cultural impact

Sheep have had a strong presence in many cultures, especially in areas where they form the most common type of livestock. In the English language, to call someone a sheep or ovine may allude that they are timid and easily led. In contradiction to this image, male sheep are often used as symbols of virility and power; the logos of the Los Angeles Rams football team and the Dodge Ram pickup truck allude to males of the bighorn sheep, Ovis canadensis.

Counting sheep is popularly said to be an aid to sleep, and some ancient systems of counting sheep persist today. Sheep also enter in colloquial sayings and idiom frequently with such phrases as "black sheep". To call an individual a black sheep implies that they are an odd or disreputable member of a group. This usage derives from the recessive trait that causes an occasional black lamb to be born into an entirely white flock. These black sheep were considered undesirable by shepherds, as black wool is not as commercially viable as white wool. Citizens who accept overbearing governments have been referred to by the Portmanteau neologism of sheeple. Somewhat differently, the adjective "sheepish" is also used to describe embarrassment.

In heraldry

In British heraldry, sheep appear in the form of rams, sheep proper and lambs. These are distinguished by the ram being depicted with horns and a tail, the sheep with neither and the lamb with its tail only. A further variant of the lamb, termed the Paschal lamb, is depicted as carrying a Christian cross and with a halo over its head. Rams' heads, portrayed without a neck and facing the viewer, are also found in British armories. The fleece, depicted as an entire sheepskin carried by a ring around its midsection, originally became known through its use in the arms of the Order of the Golden Fleece and was later adopted by towns and individuals with connections to the wool industry. A sheep on a blue field is depicted on the greater/royal arms of the king of Denmark to represent the  Faroe Islands. In 2004 a modernized arms has been adopted by the Faroe Islands, which based on a 15th century coat of arms.

Religion and folklore

In antiquity, symbolism involving sheep cropped up in religions in the ancient Near East, the Mideast, and the Mediterranean area: Çatalhöyük, ancient Egyptian religion, the Cana'anite and Phoenician tradition, Judaism, Greek religion, and others. Religious symbolism and ritual involving sheep began with some of the first known faiths: Skulls of rams (along with bulls) occupied central placement in shrines at the Çatalhöyük settlement in 8,000 BCE. In Ancient Egyptian religion, the ram was the symbol of several gods: Khnum, Heryshaf and Amun (in his incarnation as a god of fertility). Other deities occasionally shown with ram features include the goddess Ishtar, the Phoenician god Baal-Hamon, and the Babylonian god Ea-Oannes. In Madagascar, sheep were not eaten as they were believed to be incarnations of the souls of ancestors.

There are many ancient Greek references to sheep: that of Chrysomallos, the golden-fleeced ram, continuing to be told through into the modern era. Astrologically, Aries, the ram, is the first sign of the classical Greek zodiac, and the sheep is the eighth of the twelve animals associated with the 12-year cycle of in the Chinese zodiac, related to the Chinese calendar. It is said in Chinese traditions that Hou ji sacrificed sheep.  Mongolia, shagai are an ancient form of dice made from the cuboid bones of sheep that are often used for fortunetelling purposes.

Sheep play an important role in all the Abrahamic faiths; Abraham, Isaac, Jacob, Moses, King David and the Islamic prophet Muhammad were all shepherds. According to the Biblical story of the Binding of Isaac, a ram is sacrificed as a substitute for Isaac after an angel stays Abraham's hand (in the Islamic tradition, Abraham was about to sacrifice Ishmael). Eid al-Adha is a major annual festival in Islam in which sheep (or other animals) are sacrificed in remembrance of this act. Sheep are occasionally sacrificed to commemorate important secular events in Islamic cultures. Greeks and Romans sacrificed sheep regularly in religious practice, and Judaism once sacrificed sheep as a Korban (sacrifice), such as the Passover lamb. Ovine symbols—such as the ceremonial blowing of a shofar—still find a presence in modern Judaic traditions.

Collectively, followers of Christianity are often referred to as a flock, with Christ as the Good Shepherd, and sheep are an element in the Christian iconography of the birth of Jesus. Some Christian saints are considered patrons of shepherds, and even of sheep themselves. Christ is also portrayed as the Sacrificial lamb of God (Agnus Dei) and Easter celebrations in Greece and Romania traditionally feature a meal of Paschal lamb. A church leader is often called the pastor, which is derived from the Latin word for shepherd. In many western Christian traditions bishops carry a staff, which also serves as a symbol of the episcopal office, known as a crosier, which is modeled on the shepherd's crook.

Sheep are key symbols in fables and nursery rhymes like The Wolf in Sheep's Clothing, Little Bo Peep, Baa, Baa, Black Sheep, and Mary Had a Little Lamb; novels such as George Orwell's Animal Farm and Haruki Murakami's A Wild Sheep Chase; songs such as Bach's Sheep may safely graze (Schafe können sicher weiden) and Pink Floyd's "Sheep", and poems like William Blake's "The Lamb".

See also
 Chris (sheep)
 Dry Sheep Equivalent
 Fictional sheep
 Sheepfold
 Shrek (sheep)
 Sonny Wool
 U.S. Sheep Experiment Station
 Venray sheep companies
 Sheep–goat hybrid

References

Sources

External links

 American Sheep Industry
 Sheep Industry (Queensland)
 Canadian Sheep Federation
 National Sheep Association (UK)
 New Zealand Sheepbreeders Association
 Sheep magazine, all articles available free online
 View the sheep genome in Ensembl
 

Articles containing video clips
Cosmopolitan mammals
Herbivorous mammals
Livestock
Mammals described in 1758
Taxa named by Carl Linnaeus